London Midland and Scottish Railway Princess Coronation Class No. 6256 (British Railways number 46256) Sir William A. Stanier F.R.S. was a British steam locomotive.

Overview 
6256 was built in 1947 at Crewe Works.  6256 was named after the former LMS Chief Mechanical Engineer, Sir William Stanier, who had introduced the "Duchess" class ten years earlier.  It was the penultimate "Duchess" and the last LMS-built pacific.  6256, along with the last Stanier pacific, 46257 City of Salford (which appeared after nationalisation in 1948) were built with several modifications to the original Stanier design, by George Ivatt.

6256 was initially painted in LMS 1946 black livery.

After nationalisation in 1948, BR renumbered the locomotive to 46256.  It was later painted BR Brunswick green, and later BR maroon. 46256 was withdrawn in 1964, the last Stanier pacific to be withdrawn.  It was scrapped at John Cashmore Ltd, Great Bridge.

External links 
 Railuk database

6256 Sir William A. Stanier F.R.S.
Standard gauge steam locomotives of Great Britain
Railway locomotives introduced in 1947
Scrapped locomotives